Big Bottom Pow Wow is a promo album by the indie rock/punk rock group, Firehose.

The album includes several 'spiels' (conversations) about bass guitarists, the bass guitar and its place in music. These spiels include Mike Watt of Firehose and Minutemen, Cris Kirkwood of Meat Puppets, Flea of Red Hot Chili Peppers and Les Claypool of Primus.

Most of the musical tracks were previously released on Firehose albums and EPs.

Track listing

References

1994 albums
Firehose (band) albums
Columbia Records albums
Albums produced by Paul Q. Kolderie